Ares Incorporated is an American weapons manufacturer and firearms engineering company co-founded by the American weapons inventor and developer Eugene Stoner in 1971. The company is based in Port Clinton, Ohio, and produces fire control systems, turret systems, small arms, automatic cannons and industrial machinery. Mr. Stoner left the company in 1989, joining Knight's Armament Company in 1990, where his designs included the Stoner 96, a further refinement of the Ares LMG/Stoner 63.

Products
Ares has a history of innovative weapon systems, weapons, and accessories including:
1973–1978: Ares FARC (Future Assault Rifle Concept)
1974–1984: 35mm Eagle Air Defense System, 35mm autocannon, 35mm CVAST Turret System
1975–1988: 75mm XM274 Medium Caliber anti-armor automatic cannon and the XM21 Loader
1980–1982: 90mm Medium Caliber anti-armor automatic cannons
1985–1986: Ares FMG (Folding Machine Gun, designed by Francis Warin)
1984–1988: .50 caliber PCTA (Plastic Cased Telescoped Ammunition), 33% lighter than M33 cartridge
1984–1987: 20mm CTA 6-barrel Gatling Gun 
1985–1989: .50 caliber TAMG (Telescoped Ammunition Machine Gun, 40% lighter than the M2 HBMG
1985–1988: Innovative Recoil Mechanism, real time recoil control measuring recoil position and velocity
1985–1998: The Automatic Loader and 9-round Carousel Magazine for the AGS Advanced Gun System
1986–1993: Ares LMG (Light Machine Gun, aka the “Stoner 86”, a refined version of the Stoner 63)
1986–1989: AIWS (Advanced Individual Weapon System)
1986–1994: 45mm XM295 COMVAT (COMbat Vehicles Armament Technology) automatic cannon and autoloader using CT ammunition developed by Orbital-ATK
1987–1990: .50 caliber TARG (Telescoped Ammunition Revolver Gun a lightweight gun for aircraft applications
1997–1999: The Automatic Loader and 8-round Carousel Magazine for the Stryker 105mm MGS
1997–2003: The recoil mechanism for the Stryker 105mm MGS
2003–present: Sole source supplier for new and refurbished recoil mechanisms for the Stryker 105mm MGS
2001–2003: Validated the US Army Benet Laboratories' RAVEN (RArefaction WaVE Gun) concept with the 35mm Demonstrator and the Ares designed and manufactured firing mount
2004–2011: LSAT (Lightweight Small Arms Technologies), in cooperation with AAI Corporation) that included, 5.56mm CT Spiral 1 ammunition design, 5.56mm LMG weapon action, 5.56mm Carbine
2006–2013: Test and refinement of US Army Benet Laboratories' 105mm RAVEN Demonstrator and the Ares designed and manufactured firing mount
2008–2013: Designed, manufactured, and tested the Medium caliber 45mm RAVEN Demonstrator and firing mount
2005–present: 7.62mm EPG (Externally Powered Gun) designed by Gene Stoner in the early 1970s; updated and developed for today's remote weapon stations
2007–present: Developing manufacturing technology to rifle barrels with an explosively bonded Tantalum-Tungsten liner
2014–present: Design the intermediate caliber CT carbine
Small, medium, and large caliber Mann barrels and launchers

Services
 Complete firing test range encompassing over 650 acres
 Interior and exterior ballistic instrumentation
 Indoor and outdoor firing ranges
 Small arms to 155mm artillery weapons
 Gun barrel design and manufacturing
 Experimental and one-of-a-kind gun barrels
 Weapon Systems, weapons, and component design and manufacturing
 Laser bore measuring medium caliber gun barrels

Notes and sources

 Business Development Department, Ares, Inc.
 Ares, Inc. Company Brochure
 Ares, Inc. Gun Barrel Capabilities Brochure
 Ares Inc. listing at MacRaes Blue Book
 Stoner interview from the Smithsonian Institution Archives
 
 The 5.56 x 45mm: 1974–1985, 1986–1994, 1995–1999, 2000–2003, 2004–Present

External links
 Ares official website

Manufacturing companies established in 1972
Ares
Companies based in Ohio
1971 establishments in Ohio